Futebol Clube Paços de Ferreira is a Portuguese football club based in Paços de Ferreira, Porto district. Founded in 1950, the club competes in the Primeira Liga, holding home games at the 9,077-seater Estádio da Mata Real, a municipal stadium where the team has been based since 1973. The club's colours are yellow and green.

They have won four Segunda Liga titles (now Liga Portugal 2), and in 2007 they qualified for the UEFA Cup for the first time. In the 2012–13 Primeira Liga, the team finished third and qualified for the 2013–14 UEFA Champions League play-offs for the first time in their history. They were also runners-up of the 2008–09 Taça de Portugal, the 2009 Supertaça Cândido de Oliveira and the 2010–11 Taça da Liga.

History

Early history
The origin of the club dates back to the 1930s, when it was named Sport Club Pacense. They played for two decades without any official recognition until they entered the lower divisions in 1950, under the name Futebol Clube Vasco da Gama. The club then changed their kit colours to the current ones and renamed themselves Futebol Clube Paços de Ferreira.

Their first match under the current name came on 19 November 1950, beating Lousada 2–1. Agostinho Alves was the first goal scorer in the history of the Pacenses. The club then played in Portugal's third regional division until the 1956–57 season, where they were crowned champions. The club crest was created in 1961–62, and was used ever since.

The club was relegated and then promoted again and supporters hit the streets of the city on 17 June 1973 when they defeated Perosinho 3–0. One year later, they won the Terceira Divisão on 14 June 1974, after defeating Estrela de Portalegre. The hero of the match was the goalscorer Mascarenhas.

Recent history
After establishing themselves in the first division during the 1990s, and suffering a relegation in 2003–04, the club finished sixth in the first division in 2006–07, thus qualifying for the UEFA Cup, their first ever European competition, under manager José Mota. They lost 1–0 on aggregate to AZ of the Netherlands in the first round.

Having finished last in the league in 2007–08, Paços would have normally been relegated to the second level, but were readmitted after Boavista's confirmed irregularities. In the following year, already without Mota, the team finished tenth in the league and a second Europa League qualification spot after losing the Taça de Portugal final 1–0 to eventual league champions Porto on 31 May. The two clubs met again on 9 August in the Supertaça Cândido de Oliveira, which Porto won 2–0.

Paços entered the 2009–10 UEFA Europa League in the second qualifying round, where they defeated Zimbru Chișinău of Moldova before being eliminated by Bnei Yehuda Tel Aviv of Israel in the third. The club reached the 2011 Taça da Liga Final under Rui Vitória, losing 2–1 to S.L. Benfica at the Estádio Cidade de Coimbra.

In the 2012–13 season, Paços surprisingly qualified for the 2013–14 UEFA Champions League play-offs for the first time in their history after achieving third place in the league by passing favourites Braga and Sporting CP, making it their highest finish ever. The club were managed that season by Paulo Fonseca, who left at the end to join Porto, and was replaced by Costinha, who lost the Champions League playoff to Russians Zenit Saint Petersburg.

Paços' 13-year spell in the Primeira Liga ended in 2018, though they immediately returned as champions of the 2018–19 LigaPro under promotion specialist Vítor Oliveira. His successor Pepa took them to the UEFA Europa Conference League with a fifth-place finish in 2020–21, then left for Vitória de Guimarães.

League and cup history

Recent seasons

Honours
Taça de Portugal
Runners-up: 2008–09
Taça da Liga
Runners-up: 2010–11
Supertaça Cândido de Oliveira
Runners-up: 2009
Segunda Liga/LigaPro
Winners (4) – record: 1990–91, 1999–2000, 2004–05, 2018–19
Terceira Divisão
Winners: 1973–74

Youth honours 

 AF Porto Jun.B 1ª Divisão (U17)
Winners: 2013–14
 AF Porto Jun.D 1ª Divisão (U13)
Winners: 2011–12

European matches

UEFA rankings
Club ranking eligible for 2012–13

UEFA rankings; at Zerozero

Players

Current squad

Out on loan

Coaching staff

|}

Former managers

 Vítor Oliveira (1988–92)
 Neca (1992–93)
 Jaime Pacheco (1993–94)
 Raul Águas (1994–95)
 José Rachão (1995–96)
 Henrique Calisto (1996–97)
 Eurico Gomes (1 July 1997 – 30 June 1999)
 Henrique Calisto (1999)
 José Mota (8 Jan 2000 – 30 June 2003)
 José Manuel Gomes (July 2003 – 3 Oct)
 José Mota (22 Oct 2003 – 16 May 2008)
 Paulo Sérgio (22 May 2008 – 14 Oct 2009)
 Manuel Sousa (interim) (15 Oct 2009 – 18 Oct 2009)
 Ulisses Morais (19 Oct 2009 – 20 May 2010)
 Rui Vitória (3 June 2010 – 30 Aug 2011)
 Luís Miguel (31 Aug 2011 – 27 Nov 2011)
 Henrique Calisto (1 Dec 2011 – 27 May 2012)
 Paulo Fonseca (28 May 2012 – 9 June 2013)
 Costinha (17 June 2013 – 28 Oct 2013)
 Henrique Calisto (29 Oct 2013 – 24 Feb 2014)
 Jorge Costa (26 Feb 2014 – 30 June 2014)
 Paulo Fonseca (1 July 2014 – 26 May 2015)
 Jorge Simão (25 June 2015 – 21 May 2016)
 Carlos Pinto (1 July 2016 – 28 November 2016)
 Vasco Seabra (29 November 2016 – 23 October 2017)
 Petit (23 October 2017 – 9 January 2018)
 João Henriques (12 January 2018 – 21 May 2018)
 Pepa (September, 2019 – 19 May 2021)
 Jorge Simão (21 June 2021 –)

Supporters
The supporters' club, "Ultras Yellow Boys," was founded in 1996, then disbanded but returning afterwards in 2001. Two previous groups, however extinct, existed: "Febre Amarela" and "Yellowmania".

References

External links

Official website 
Zerozero team profile
Detailed up-to-date club news

 
Pacos de Ferreira
Association football clubs established in 1950
F.C.
1950 establishments in Portugal
Primeira Liga clubs
Liga Portugal 2 clubs